Stadionul Progresul Spartac is a football-specific stadium in Bucharest, Romania. It is the home ground of Progresul Spartac București and has a capacity of 1,030 seats. The stadium was formerly known as Stadionul Prefabricate, but in 2014 it was bought by Progresul Spartac București and renamed. After the transaction, the newly formed club, which considers itself as a direct successor of FC Progresul București, began numerous modernization works, so the pitch (which was in a very bad condition) was changed with an artificial one, three stands were installed (Main Stand - 300 seats, Second Stand - 230 seats, East End - 500 seats), a flood-light installation with a capacity of 200 lux and two other indoor football grounds.

References

External links
Stadionul Progresul Spartac at soccerway.com

Football venues in Romania
Sport in Bucharest
Buildings and structures in Bucharest